Will the Real Jerry Lewis Please Sit Down  is a 1970 animated showcase for various caricatured Jerry Lewis characters, all based on characters from the 1965 film The Family Jewels, and styled in a fashion similar to Archie's TV Funnies and the Groovie Goolies. The title is a variant of the deciding question on the game show To Tell the Truth: "Will the real __ please stand up?" Like most 1970s-era Saturday morning cartoon series, Will the Real Jerry Lewis Please Sit Down contained an adult laugh track.

Though Jerry Lewis contributed to some of the scripts, he did not voice any of the characters. The central character of Jerry Lewis was voiced by David Lander, who would later be better known for his role of Squiggy on Laverne & Shirley.

Premise
As with all of their wilder comedies, such as those mentioned above and later shows like Uncle Croc's Block and The Secret Lives of Waldo Kitty, Filmation stuffed the episodes with slapstick jokes, and the rubbery, gangly animated version of Lewis was well realised and similar to his depiction in DC Comics' long running comic book title, The Adventures of Jerry Lewis (originally published as The Adventures of Dean Martin and Jerry Lewis prior to the dissolution of their show business partnership). Among the recurring characters were Chinese detective Hong Kong Flewis and his rotund son, One Ton Son; his father, Professor Lewis; and his sister Geraldine (and her pet frog, Spot).  Presumably, the series takes place somewhere in the New York/New Jersey/Connecticut tri-state area, since in one episode, Jerry sees a road sign that reads "Atlantic City. 216 miles."

In the series, Jerry worked for the Odd Job Employment Agency under the supervision of the obnoxious Mr. Blunderpuss. A typical episode found Jerry being assigned a job, and making a complete shambles of it in his harmless, naive way.

Notably wild in their style were the opening credits and commercial bumpers. The theme song was sung in a contemporary "bubblegum" style, with the song interrupted before the end of its final verse with the title of the show intoned in a scolding manner by an announcer (Howard Morris) who stretched out the word "please" and shouted "sit down". Will The Real Jerry Lewis Please Sit Down contained several ethnic (notably Asian) stereotypes.

Along with Groovie Goolies, this was one of the first Filmation series to feature the rotating Lou Scheimer/Norm Prescott "wheel" credit. Previous shows featured a standard credit with Scheimer's name above Prescott's. It was also Filmation's first show to feature director Hal Sutherland's name written in fancy lettering.

Cast
 David Lander as Jerry Lewis
 Howard Morris as Mr. Blunderpuss, Ralph Rotten Lewis, Professor Lewis, One Ton Son, Hong Kong Flewis, Uncle Seadog, additional voices
 Jane Webb as Geraldine Lewis, Rhonda (Jerry's girlfriend)

Episodes

References

External links
 
 
 Will The Real Jerry Lewis Please Sit Down at Toon Tracker

American Broadcasting Company original programming
1970s American animated television series
1970 American television series debuts
1972 American television series endings
Television series by Filmation
Television series by Universal Television
Jerry Lewis
Animation based on real people
American children's animated comedy television series
Television shows directed by Hal Sutherland